The 29th Guldbagge Awards ceremony, presented by the Swedish Film Institute, honored the best Swedish films of 1993, and took place on 31 October 1994. The Slingshot directed by Åke Sandgren was presented with the award for Best Film.

Winner and nominees

Awards

Winners are listed first and highlighted in boldface.

References

External links
Official website
Guldbaggen on Facebook
Guldbaggen on Twitter
29th Guldbagge Awards at Internet Movie Database

1994 in Sweden
1993 film awards
Guldbagge Awards ceremonies
October 1994 events in Europe
1990s in Stockholm